Pretty Poison may refer to:

 Pretty Poison (group), an American dance group
 Pretty Poison (film), a 1968 film
 Pretty Poison (manga), a Japanese manga
 Pretty Poison (Batman: The Animated Series), an episode of Batman: The Animated Series
 Pretty Poison, the 2021 debut EP by American singer Nessa Barrett